Addison Road is a road in London, England, which connects Kensington High Street with Notting Hill and Holland Park Avenue and runs nearby to Holland Park.

History and residents 

The name of the road derives from the essayist and statesman Joseph Addison (1672–1719), as with Addison Avenue nearby.

The road was begun in the 1820s. The church of St Barnabas at No. 23 was built in 1829, designed by Lewis Vulliamy in a Tudor Gothic style, with later stained glass by Edward Burne-Jones (executed by Morris & Co.) and Byam Shaw. St James Norlands Church at the far end of Addison Avenue also designed by Vulliamy, was built in 1845.

Debenham House at 8 Addison Road was designed for Sir Ernest Debenham in 1905–6 by Halsey Ricardo. The Arts and Crafts-style house is an example of "structural polychromy". It includes Byzanto-Italianate grey bricks, Doulton Carrara ware, green-glazed bricks, and turquoise tiles. Inside, there is a dome and Arts and Crafts decoration.

From 1869 to 1916, there was an Addison Road station to the west of Addison Road itself, for a railway line that provided services between Waterloo and Richmond.

Addison Road is home to the Cardinal Vaughan Memorial School, a Roman Catholic boys' school (which permits entry to girls in its Sixth Form).

The novelist and playwright John Galsworthy lived at 14 Addison Road from 1905 to 1913. Other notable inhabitants have included: Chaim Weizmann, the first President of the State of Israel, who lived at No. 67 between 1916 and 1919; David Lloyd George, who resided at No. 2 between 1928 and 1936; James Locke, who is credited with giving Tweed its name, and the architect Eustace Balfour.

Residential properties 

Debenham House, cited above, is often used for filming purposes. Although no longer privately owned, it is thought to be worth between £40-50 million.

The majority of houses located on Addison Road are worth between £10-30 million, and consequently the street is one of the most expensive residential streets in the world, and the second most expensive in London (behind Kensington Palace Gardens).

Location 
To the east is Holland Park. To the west is Holland Road and West Kensington. It parts from the A3220 road leading to Warwick Gardens ahead. Warwick Gardens ahead closes through traffic at 10pm to 7am.

Kensington Olympia railway station was originally named Addison Road although it is some distance away from the road itself.

St Barnabas, Kensington, is a Church of England church in the road.

See also
List of eponymous roads in London

References

External links
 

Streets in the Royal Borough of Kensington and Chelsea